Botany Downs Secondary College is a state coeducational secondary school located in the Auckland, New Zealand suburb of East Tamaki. The school opened at the beginning of the 2004 school year to serve new residential development in the eastern Auckland area. Serving Years 9 to 13, the school has a roll of approximately  students.

History
Botany Downs Secondary College was gazetted by Education Minister Trevor Mallard on 12 November 2001, with the working name Howick South Secondary School. The school opened in January 2004, initially taking Year 9 students only. The remaining school years opened as the 2004 Year 9 students moved through, with the school fully opening at the beginning of 2008.

Logo
The logo design uses the circles of the Beta and Delta characters from the Greek alphabet. 
The inner circle represents the student.
The outer circle represents the nurturing and educating by the teacher.
The overlapping circles echo the traditional role of the educator and the student.
The outer shape links the circles, envelops the whole school community and is pointing towards the future.

Education Review Office (ERO)
Last visited by ERO in August 2016. The next review is due in 4–5 years (2020-2021).

ERO found that "Students at Botany Downs Secondary School are highly engaged in learning and value the rich opportunities they have to grow personally and academically. Leaders and teachers work in partnership with students to learn, think and inquire. NCEA qualifications success in the college is sustained at very high levels because of the strength in the NZC focused school vision."

Whanau system
The Whanau system in BDSC is designed to create a 'family' atmosphere; a "home away from home". It encourages a sense of a community based learning environment. There were previously 4 Whanau, with the late addition of Britten and Koru.

Koru Whanau (Green) 
John Britten Whanau (Black) 
Spirit Whanau (Purple) 
Discovery Whanau (Blue) 
Endeavour Whanau (Yellow) 
Sir Peter Blake Whanau (Red)

Notable alumni

 Tafito Lafaele – rugby union player
 Ben Nee-Nee – rugby union player

References

External links
Botany Downs Secondary College official site

Botany downs Secondary College at New Zealand Educated

Secondary schools in Auckland
Educational institutions established in 2004
2004 establishments in New Zealand